Lakhahi is a village, large Gram panchayat and a Nyaya Panchayat in Dhaurehra tehsil Lakhimpur Kheri district, Uttar Pradesh state, India.

It was earlier famous for ketki Flowers. Ketki were found in the royal foolbagh which was of rulers of Lakhahi

References

Villages in Lakhimpur Kheri district